Btermaz     is a Lebanese Sunni Muslim and Maronite Christian village, located in the Miniyeh-Danniyeh District. It had 1,767 eligible voters in the 2009 elections.

History
In 1838, Eli Smith noted  the village as Bturmaz,  located in the Ed-Dunniyeh area. The inhabitants were Sunni Muslim.

References

Bibliography

External links
Btermaz, Localiban

Populated places in Miniyeh-Danniyeh District
Populated places in Lebanon
Sunni Muslim communities in Lebanon
Maronite Christian communities in Lebanon